Rauma dialect ("rauman giäl", "language of Rauma") is a Southwestern dialect of Finnish spoken in the town of Rauma, Finland.

The written form of the dialect was preserved by the writer and doctor Hj. Nortamo, and is currently practiced mainly as a hobby. Some of the most distinctive characteristics of the dialect (as written) are the use of letters 'g' and 'b', which are uncommon in the Finnish language. Pronunciation of these letters is, however, is in between 'g' and 'p' and are close to the 'k' and 'p' of mainstream Finnish. And the shortening of words The Rauma dialect also contains its own pitch accent.

History 
Rauma is only spoken in a very small area of Finland, the Rauma dialect was not influenced by the Tavastian dialects unlike its neighbours, but instead Rauma was influenced by other languages such as Swedish. During the 19th century Rauma was one of the most active sea ports and during that time most Rauma people were working in the sea, which caused them to take words and influence from all over Europe. When the written language of Finnish was created, it was strictly banned to write in Finnish dialects. However it was changed when the writer Hj.Nortamo started writing in Rauma. 

Recently, there have been some dictionaries released for the Rauma dialect

Rauma used to have the sound /θ/ and it was even heard at the end of the 20th century. Rauma also had a sound /ð/, however now even in Rauma a sound /r/ has been replacing it.

Examples with Finnish and English translations 

 "San snää mnuu snuuks, snuuks mnääki snuu sno."
 Finnish: 
 Spoken Finnish of Helsinki area: 
 English: "You should call me 'thou', as I will call you 'thou' too." (Used when dropping titles and starting to use first names.)
 "Ol niingon gotonas"
 Finnish: 
 Spoken Finnish of Helsinki area: 
 English: "Feel yourself at home."
 "Luanikast reissu"
 Finnish: 
 Spoken Finnish of Helsinki area: 
 English: "Have a nice journey."
 "Mnää on Raumalt, mist snää ot?"
 Finnish: 
 Spoken Finnish of Helsinki area: 
 English: "I am from Rauma, where are you from?"
 "Mimne baat snuul o?"
 Finnish: Minkälainen vene sinulla on? 
 Spoken Finnish of Helsinki area: Millane botski sul o?
 English: "What kind of a boat do you have?"

Features 
Shorter words

ihmettlevä 'they wonder' (Finnish: ihmettelevät)

Shorter vowels

totus 'truth' (Finnish: totuus 'truth')

k, t and p before a nasal consonant.

t becomes d, k becomes g, and p becomes b before a nasal consonant.

 'I also come here to see'

Diphthongs

yö, ie, and uo became: yä, iä and ua.

diphthongs that end in u, y and i have changed into o, ö and e, if the next syllable does not start with: d, r, l, h or v.

kööh 'poor' (Finnish 'köyhä')

Final -t

the ending -t is gone in the Rauma dialect, but it is replaced by: k, t, p, s or f, if the next word is followed by those letters.

 'the boys were happy'.

 'the girls wanted into their company'

Plural genetive

In the Rauma dialect, the plural genetive is marked by -tte.

References

External links 
 Uusi Rauma, a newspaper which publishes a complete issue in Rauma dialect once a year and publishes weekly columns in Rauma dialect. Back issues with Rauma dialect
 Nortamo seor
 Music in Rauma

Finnish dialects
Rauma, Finland